The Centaur is a novel by John Updike, published by Alfred A. Knopf in 1963. It won the U.S. National Book Award for Fiction. Portions of the novel first appeared in Esquire and The New Yorker.

The French translation of the novel won the Prix du Meilleur Livre Étranger (Best Foreign Book Prize).

Plot summary
The story concerns George Caldwell, a school teacher, and his son Peter, outside of Alton (i.e., Reading), Pennsylvania. The novel explores the relationship between the depressive Caldwell and his anxious son, loosely based on John Updike's relationship with his father, Wesley Updike, a teacher at Shillington High School. George has largely given up on life; what glory he knew, as a football player and soldier in World War I, has passed.  He feels put upon by the school's principal, and he views his students as hapless and uninterested in anything he has to teach them.  Peter, meanwhile, is a budding aesthete who idolizes Vermeer and dreams of becoming a painter in a big city, like New York.  He has no friends his age, and regularly worries that his peers might detect his psoriasis, which stains his skin and flecks his clothes every season but summer.  One thing George and Peter share is the desire to get out, to escape their hometown.  This masculine desire for escape appears in Updike's famed "Rabbit" novels.  Similarly, the novel's image of Peter's mother alone on an untended farm is one we later see in Updike's 1965 novel Of the Farm.

Themes
Like James Joyce in Ulysses, Updike drew on the myths of antiquity in an attempt to turn a modern and common scene into something more profound, a meditation on life and man's relationship to nature and eternity.  George is both the Centaur Chiron and Prometheus (some readers might see George's son Peter as Prometheus), Mr. Hummel, the automobile mechanic, is Hephaestus (AKA Vulcan); and so forth.  The novel's structure is unusual; the narrative shifts from present day (late 1940s) to prospective (early 1960s), from describing the characters as George, Vera, and the rest, to the Centaur, Venus, and so forth.  It also is punctuated with a feverish dream scene and George's obituary.  Near the end of the novel, Updike includes two untranslated Greek sentences.  Their translation is as follows: 
This quote is from Bibliotheca 2.5.4, and describes the death of Chiron.

References

1963 American novels
National Book Award for Fiction winning works
Novels by John Updike
Alfred A. Knopf books
Novels set in Pennsylvania
Novels about artists